"Alfred's Theme" is a song by American rapper Eminem and the third track from the deluxe edition of his eleventh studio album Music to Be Murdered By via Interscope, Aftermath, and Shady Records. It was both produced and written by Marshall Mathers, Luis Resto, and Charles Gounod. It samples the theme song to the anthology television series Alfred Hitchcock Presents.

The song peaked at number 85 on the Canadian Hot 100.

Music video 

The lyrical music video for "Alfred's Theme" was released on May 5, 2021 and features animation similar to "Tone Deaf". It pays homage to Alfred Hitchcock films including Vertigo and Psycho. On the same day, an illustrated lyric book based on the music video was announced on Twitter which could be purchased on Eminem's online store.

The segments in the music video includes Slim Shady looking through his binoculars (Rear Window), a black bird pulling out an eye of a corpse (The Birds), Shady running down the staircases (Blackmail), and stabbing a person (Psycho).

Personnel
Marshall Mathers – main artist, vocals, songwriter, producer
Charles Gounod – writer
Luis Resto – songwriter, keyboards
Brent Kolatalo – recorder
Mike Strange – recorder, mixer
Tony Campana – recorder
Dominic Rivinius – brass, percussion
Ken Lewis – mixer

Charts

References 

2020 songs
Eminem songs
Songs written by Eminem
Songs written by Luis Resto (musician)